Alexandria is a feminine given name, derived from Alexander the Great and the towns he named, most notably the city of Alexandria, Egypt.

Alexandria was the 352nd most popular name for girls born in the United States in 2021. For the US in the years since 1900, it was most popular in 1993 when it ranked 69th. It was not in the top 1,000 girls baby names before 1969.

People named Alexandria 
 Alexandria Anderson, American runner
 Alexandria Boehm, American scientist 
 Alexandria Bombach, American filmmaker 
 Alexandria Constantinova Szeman, American author
 Alexandria Haber, Canadian playwright 
 Alexandria Karlsen, American actress
 Alexandria Loutitt, Canadian ski jumper
 Alexandria Maillot, Canadian actress
 Alexandria Mills, American beauty pageant winner
 Alexandria Ocasio-Cortez, American politician
 Alexandria Riordan, American figure skater
 Alexandria Smith, American artist 
 Alexandria Town, Canadian wrestler
 Alexandria Villaseñor, American climate activist
 Alexandria Wailes, American actress

See also 

 Alexandrea Owens-Sarno, American actress

 

 Alexandria (disambiguation)

References 

English feminine given names